Rioux is a commune in the Charente-Maritime department in southwestern France. It is best known for its Romanesque church, particularly its fine corbel table.

Population

See also
Communes of the Charente-Maritime department

References

Communes of Charente-Maritime